Petit's cuckooshrike (Campephaga petiti) is a species of bird in the family Campephagidae.
It is found in Angola, Cameroon, Republic of the Congo, Democratic Republic of the Congo, Gabon, Kenya, Nigeria, and Uganda.
Its natural habitats are subtropical or tropical moist lowland forest and subtropical or tropical moist montane forest.

References

Petit's cuckooshrike
Birds of Central Africa
Petit's cuckooshrike
Taxonomy articles created by Polbot